Prosper is an unincorporated community in Cass County, in the U.S. state of North Dakota.

History
Prosper had its start in 1911 when the railroad was extended to that point. A post office was established at Prosper in 1913, and remained in operation until 1968.

References

 Unincorporated communities in Cass County, North Dakota
 Unincorporated communities in North Dakota